The tenth season of the American animated television series The Simpsons was originally broadcast on the Fox network in the United States between August 23, 1998, and May 16, 1999. It contains twenty-three episodes, starting with "Lard of the Dance". The Simpsons is a satire of a middle class American lifestyle epitomized by its family of the same name, which consists of Homer, Marge, Bart, Lisa and Maggie. Set in the fictional city of Springfield, the show lampoons American culture, society, television, and many aspects of the human condition.

The showrunner for the tenth season was Mike Scully. Before production began, a salary dispute between the main cast members of The Simpsons and Fox arose. However, it was soon settled and the actors' salaries were raised to $125,000 per episode. In addition to the large Simpsons cast, many guest stars appeared in season ten, including Phil Hartman in his last appearance due to his death months earlier in May 1998.

Despite winning an Annie Award for "Outstanding Achievement in an Animated Television Program", season 10 has been cited by several critics as the beginning of the series' decline in quality. It ranked twenty-fifth in the season ratings with an average of 13.5 million viewers per episode. The tenth season DVD boxset was released in the United States and Canada on August 7, 2007. It is available in two different packagings.

Production
The tenth season was the second during which Mike Scully served as show runner (he had previously run the ninth season), with the season being produced by Gracie Films and 20th Century Fox Television. As show runner and executive producer, Scully headed the writing staff and oversaw all aspects of the show's production. However, as he told UltimateTV in January 1999, he did not "make any decisions without the staff's input. We have great staffs in all the departments from animation to writing. So I don't want to make it sound like a dictatorship." Scully was popular with the staff members, many of whom have praised his organization and management skills. Writer Tom Martin has said that he was "quite possibly the best boss I've ever worked for" and "a great manager of people". Scully's aim while running The Simpsons was to "not wreck the show". In addition to his role as show runner during the tenth season, he co-wrote the episode "Sunday, Cruddy Sunday".

In 1999, there were around sixteen staff writers working on The Simpsons. Many of them had written for the show for several years, including John Swartzwelder and George Meyer. The third episode of the tenth season, "Bart the Mother", was the last full-length episode written by David S. Cohen, a longtime writer on the show. He left to team up with The Simpsons creator Matt Groening to develop Futurama, a series on which he served as executive producer and head writer. The tenth season marked the full-time return of staff member Al Jean, who had departed from the show after the fourth season to create the animated series The Critic. Between seasons four and ten, he had only worked periodically on the show, writing four episodes.

The main cast of the season consisted of Dan Castellaneta (Homer Simpson, Grampa Simpson, Krusty the Clown, among others), Julie Kavner (Marge Simpson), Nancy Cartwright (Bart Simpson, Ralph Wiggum, Nelson Muntz), Yeardley Smith (Lisa Simpson), Hank Azaria (Moe Szyslak, Apu Nahasapeemapetilon, Chief Wiggum, among others) and Harry Shearer (Ned Flanders, Mr. Burns, Principal Skinner, among others). Up until the production of season ten in 1998, these six main voice actors were paid $30,000 per episode. In 1998, a salary dispute between them and the Fox Broadcasting Company (which airs The Simpsons) arose, with the actors threatening to go on a strike. Fox went as far as preparing for casting of new voices, but an agreement was soon made and the actors' salaries were raised to $125,000 per episode. Groening expressed his sympathy for the cast members in an issue of Mother Jones a while after the salary dispute had been settled. He told the magazine: "They are incredibly talented, and they deserve a chance to be as rich and miserable as anyone else in Hollywood. It looked for a while there like we might not have a show, because everyone was holding firm on all sides. That's still my attitude: Hold out for as much money as you can get, but do make the deal."

Other cast members of the season included Pamela Hayden (Milhouse Van Houten, among others), Tress MacNeille (Agnes Skinner, among others), Maggie Roswell (Helen Lovejoy, Maude Flanders, among others), Russi Taylor (Martin Prince), and Karl Wiedergott. Season ten also featured a large number of guest stars, including Phil Hartman in his final appearance on the show in the episode "Bart the Mother" that originally aired in September 27, 1998. Hartman was shot dead by his wife four months before the episode aired and it was dedicated to his memory. Rather than replacing Hartman with a new voice actor, the production staff retired two of his recurring characters, Troy McClure and Lionel Hutz, from the show. Hutz and McClure still appear in various Simpsons comics.

Voice cast & characters

This is the last season to feature the character Troy McClure, voiced by Phil Hartman. Following Hartman's death on May 28, 1998, McClure was retired along with Hartman's other recurring character Lionel Hutz; his final speaking role as McClure was in the third episode "Bart the Mother", which aired four months after his death. The episode was dedicated to Hartman.

Main cast
 Dan Castellaneta as Homer Simpson, Grampa Simpson, Krusty the Clown, Groundskeeper Willie, Barney Gumble, Santa's Little Helper, and various others
 Julie Kavner as Marge Simpson, Patty Bouvier, Selma Bouvier and various others
 Nancy Cartwright as Bart Simpson, Nelson Muntz, Ralph Wiggum and various others
 Yeardley Smith as Lisa Simpson
 Harry Shearer as Mr. Burns, Waylon Smithers, Ned Flanders, Principal Skinner, Lenny Leonard, Kent Brockman, Reverend Lovejoy, and various others
 Hank Azaria as Moe Szyslak, Chief Wiggum, Professor Frink, Comic Book Guy, Apu, Bumblebee Man and various others

Recurring
 Pamela Hayden as Milhouse van Houten, Jimbo Jones
 Maggie Roswell as Maude Flanders, Helen Lovejoy and Miss Hoover
 Russi Taylor as Martin Prince and Sherri and Terri
 Tress MacNeille as Agnes Skinner
 Marcia Wallace as Edna Krabappel
 Karl Wiedergott as additional characters

Guest stars

 Lisa Kudrow as Alex Whitney ("Lard of the Dance")
 William Daniels as KITT ("The Wizard of Evergreen Terrace")
 Phil Hartman as Troy McClure ("Bart the Mother")
 Robert Englund as Freddy Krueger  ("Treehouse of Horror IX")
 Ed McMahon as himself  ("Treehouse of Horror IX")
 Jerry Springer as himself  ("Treehouse of Horror IX")
 Regis Philbin as himself  ("Treehouse of Horror IX", live-action sequence)
 Kathie Lee Gifford as herself  ("Treehouse of Horror IX", live-action sequence)
 Alec Baldwin as himself ("When You Dish Upon a Star") 
 Kim Basinger as herself ("When You Dish Upon a Star")
 Ron Howard as himself ("When You Dish Upon a Star")
 Brian Grazer as himself  ("When You Dish Upon a Star")
 Yo La Tengo perform the end theme in "D'oh-in' in the Wind"
 George Carlin as Munchie("D'oh-in' in the Wind")
 Martin Mull as Seth ("D'oh-in' in the Wind")
 Mark Hamill as himself and Leavelle("Mayored to the Mob")
 Joe Mantegna as Fat Tony("Mayored to the Mob")
 Dick Tufeld as Lost in Space Robot ("Mayored to the Mob")
 The Moody Blues as themselves ("Viva Ned Flanders")
 Cyndi Lauper as herself ("Wild Barts Can't Be Broken")
 Troy Aikman as himself ("Sunday, Cruddy Sunday")
 Rosey Grier as himself ("Sunday, Cruddy Sunday")
 John Madden as himself ("Sunday, Cruddy Sunday")
 Dan Marino as himself ("Sunday, Cruddy Sunday")
 Rupert Murdoch as himself ("Sunday, Cruddy Sunday")
 Dolly Parton as herself ("Sunday, Cruddy Sunday")
 Pat Summerall as himself ("Sunday, Cruddy Sunday")
 Fred Willard as Wally Kogen ("Sunday, Cruddy Sunday")
 Ed Begley Jr. as himself ("Homer to the Max")
 Jan Hooks as Manjula Nahasapeemapetilon ("I'm with Cupid")
 Elton John as himself ("I'm with Cupid")
 John Kassir as Possum ("Marge Simpson in: 'Screaming Yellow Honkers'")
 Hank Williams Jr. as Canyonero singer ("Marge Simpson in: 'Screaming Yellow Honkers'")
 Isabella Rossellini as Astrid Weller ("Mom and Pop Art")
 Jasper Johns as himself ("Mom and Pop Art")
 Jack LaLanne as himself  ("The Old Man and the 'C' Student")
 Michael McKean as Jerry Rude ("Monty Can't Buy Me Love")
 Stephen Hawking as himself ("They Saved Lisa's Brain")
 George Takei as Wink ("Thirty Minutes over Tokyo")
 Denice Kumagai as Japanese Mother ("Thirty Minutes over Tokyo")
 Karen Maruyama as Japanese Stewardess ("Thirty Minutes over Tokyo")
 Gedde Watanabe as Japanese Father and Waiter ("Thirty Minutes over Tokyo")
 Keone Young as Sumo Wrestler ("Thirty Minutes over Tokyo")

Release

Broadcast and ratings
The tenth season of The Simpsons was originally broadcast in the United States on the Fox network between August 23, 1998, and May 16, 1999. Although "Lard of the Dance" aired on August 23 to increase ratings for the early premieres of That '70s Show by serving as a lead-in, "The Wizard of Evergreen Terrace" (airing on September 20, 1998) was the official premiere of the tenth season. The season aired in the 8:00 p.m. time slot on Sundays. It ranked twenty-fifth (tied with Dharma & Greg) in the ratings for the 1998–1999 television season with an average of 13.5 million viewers per episode, dropping twelve percent in number of average viewers from the last season. The Simpsons was Fox's third highest-rated show of the television season, following The X-Files (ranked twelfth) and Ally McBeal (ranked twentieth).

Critical reception
The tenth season has been cited by some critics and fans as the beginning of the series' decline in quality. By 2000, some long-term fans had become disillusioned with the show and pointed to its shift from character-driven plots to what they perceived as an overemphasis on zany antics and gags. Chris Turner wrote in his book Planet Simpson that "one of the things that emerged was that [the staff] began to rely on gags, not characters, wherever that switch got flipped, whether it's the ninth or tenth season." Jesse Hassenger of PopMatters named the tenth season of The Simpsons the series' "first significant dip in quality, a step away from its golden era [...] with broader gags and more outlandish plots," and a BBC News writer commented that "the common consensus is that The Simpsons' golden era ended after season nine". Similarly, Tyler Wilson of Coeur d'Alene Press has referred to seasons one to nine as the show's "golden age." On Rotten Tomatoes however, the tenth season of The Simpsons has a 100% approval rating based on 5 critical reviews. DVD Verdict's Mac McEntire noted in a review that while the tenth season contains "a lot of laughs", it is missing the emotional core of the earlier seasons. Chris Barsanti of Filmcritic.com has commented that around the time the tenth season aired, "not only did the show start losing its status as untouchable—read: everyone stopped expecting every episode to be a masterpiece—it also developed the bad habit of building episodes around celebrity guests, who were practically never as amusing as they were meant to be." Michael Passman of The Michigan Daily wrote in 2007 that "in hindsight, the 10th season can now be seen as a tipping point of sorts for a number of the show's less attractive plot devices. Homer's get-rich-quick schemes start to become all too prevalent, and there are an inordinate amount of unnecessary celebrity cameos." Passman did not only have negative things to say about the tenth season, though. He commented that it "is not the last great 'Simpsons' season ever. The last great season was the eighth. The last really good season was the ninth. But the tenth is just pretty good, nothing more, nothing less."

Mike Scully, who was showrunner during seasons nine through twelve, is held responsible by many critics and fans for the decline. An op-ed in Slate by Chris Suellentrop argued that The Simpsons changed from a realistic show about family life into a typical cartoon when Scully was the show runner: "under Scully's tenure, The Simpsons became, well, a cartoon.  Episodes that once would have ended with Homer and Marge bicycling into the sunset now end with Homer blowing a tranquilizer dart into Marge's neck. The show's still funny, but it hasn't been touching in years." John Ortved wrote in his book The Simpsons: An Uncensored, Unauthorized History that "Scully's episodes excel when compared to what The Simpsons airs nowadays, but he was the man at the helm when the ship turned towards the iceberg." The Simpsons under Scully has been negatively labeled as a "gag-heavy, Homer-centric incarnation" by Jon Bonné of MSNBC, and many fans have bemoaned the transformation in Homer's character during the era, from sweet and sincere to "a boorish, self-aggrandizing oaf", dubbing him "Jerkass Homer".

The Simpsons writer Tom Martin said in Ortved's book that he does not understand the criticism against Scully because he thinks Scully ran the show well. He also commented that he thinks the criticism "bothered [Scully], and still bothers him, but he managed to not get worked up over it." Ortved noted in his book that it is hard to tell how much of the decline is Scully's fault, and that blaming a single show runner for lowering the quality of the show "is unfair." He also wrote that some of the episodes from Scully's first two seasons (nine and ten), such as "The Wizard of Evergreen Terrace" and "When You Dish Upon a Star", are better than certain episodes of the two previous seasons.

UGO Networks' Brian Tallerico has defended the season against the criticism. He wrote in a 2007 review that comparing "tenth season Simpsons episodes to the prime of the series (3–7) is just unfair and really kind of self-defeating. 'Yeah, I laughed, but not as hard as a couple of years ago. So it sucks.' That's nonsense. The fact is that even the tenth season of The Simpsons was funnier than most [other] show's  best years." PopMatters Hassenger commented in his review that although the show had declined in quality, "this is not to say that these episodes are without their charm; many, in fact, are laugh-out-loud funny and characteristically smart." Similarly to Tallerico, he also noted that "weaker Simpsons seasons are superior to most television."

Despite the criticisms of season ten, it has been included in some definitions of The Simpsons golden age, usually as the point where the show began to decline but still put out some of the last great episodes. Ian Nathan of Empire described the show's classic era as being "the first ten seasons", while Rubbercat.net believes that "discussing what constitutes The Simpsons 'golden era' is a universal constant," in this case being seasons 3–10. Jon Heacock of LucidWorks states that while season ten was "the season in which, according to many, the show starts to go sour," it was also the final season where "the show was consistently at the top of its game," with "so many moments, quotations, and references – both epic and obscure – that helped turn the Simpson family into the cultural icons that they remain to this day."

In an article written for the Modern Day Pirates titled "In Search of The Last Classic Simpsons Episode", author Brandon listed "Homer to the Max" and "They Saved Lisa's Brain", both from the tenth season, as contenders for the latest episode that made him feel like he was "watching The Simpsons in their heyday."

Awards and nominations

The season and its episodes gathered some awards and award nominations. The Simpsons won the 1999 Annie Award for "Outstanding Achievement in an Animated Television Program", beating Batman Beyond, Futurama, King of the Hill, and The New Batman/Superman Adventures. That same year, Tim Long, Larry Doyle, and Matt Selman received an Annie Award in the "Outstanding Individual Achievement for Writing in an Animated Television Production" category for writing "Simpsons Bible Stories", the eighteenth episode of the tenth season. The trio faced competition from writers of Futurama ("The Series Has Landed"), King of the Hill ("Hank's Cowboy Movie"), Batman Beyond ("Rebirth Part I"), and Space Ghost Coast to Coast ("Lawsuit"). The Simpsons was also nominated for two Emmy Awards in 1999, though the show did not win either. The season ten episode "Viva Ned Flanders" lost in the "Outstanding Animated Program (for Programming Less Than One Hour)" category to "And They Call It Bobby Love" of King of the Hill. Alf Clausen was nominated in the "Outstanding Music Composition for a Series" category for his work on "Treehouse of Horror IX", the fourth episode of the tenth season, but lost the award to Carl Johnson of Invasion America.

Episodes

DVD release
The DVD boxset for season ten was released by 20th Century Fox Home Entertainment in the United States and Canada on August 7, 2007, eight years after it had completed broadcast on television. As well as every episode from the season, the DVD release features bonus material including audio commentaries for every episode, deleted scenes, and animatics. The set was released in two different packagings: a standard rectangular cardboard box featuring Bart on the cover driving through a security checkpoint gate at the 20th Century Fox movie studio, and a "limited edition" plastic packaging molded to look like Bart's head.

References
General

 
 

Specific

Notes

External links

Episode guide at The Simpsons.com
Episode guide at the BBC

Simpsons season 10
1998 American television seasons
1999 American television seasons